Joacim Emil Godhei Holtan (born 8 August 1998) is a Norwegian footballer who plays as a forward for Kongsvinger on loan from Haugesund.

Career
Holtan started his career with Start, where he did not manage to break through to the first team. He instead joined sixth-tier Torridal in 2018. Having scored seven goals in seven games, he was snapped up by fifth-tier Mandalskameratene later that year. After two seasons with Mandalskameratene, he moved to third-tier Bryne in 2020. He spent another two seasons at Bryne, before signing a four-year contract with first-tier Haugesund in March 2022. On 3 April 2022, he made his Eliteserien debut in a 3–1 loss against Sandefjord.

In February 2023, he signed for Kongsvinger on loan for the 2023 season with the option to buy.

Career statistics

References

External links

1998 births
Living people
People from Vennesla
Association football forwards
Norwegian footballers
IK Start players
Mandalskameratene players
Bryne FK players
FK Haugesund players
Kongsvinger IL Toppfotball players
Norwegian Fourth Division players
Norwegian Third Division players
Norwegian Second Division players
Norwegian First Division players
Eliteserien players
Sportspeople from Agder